Cathedral Historic District may refer to: 

Cathedral Historic District (Dubuque, Iowa)
Cathedral Historic District (Sioux Falls, South Dakota)